Evan Brandt is a reporter covering Pottstown, Pennsylvania for The Mercury. Brandt has received media coverage for being the newspaper's last reporter located in Pottstown.

Personal life 
Brandt went to Pleasantville High School. After graduating college, he worked at suburban weeklies. Brandt started working at The Mercury in 1997.

Brandt is the biological son of writer Anthony S. Brandt and Barbara Brandt, and the stepson of Lorraine Dusky. His stepmother was previously a newspaper reporter.

Brandt is married to Karen Maxfield and has one son.

Selected works 
According to The New York Times, Brandt has received 36 journalism awards.

In the early 2000s, Brandt exposed a chemical company's warehouse which closed and became part of Montgomery County Community College.

Brandt's coverage of the proposed Pottstown YMCA closure helped keep it open.

His coverage of the shortage of computers for disadvantaged students prompted a $60,000 donation.

References

Living people
20th-century American male writers
American male journalists
Year of birth missing (living people)